Marie Laure Tardieu-Blot (17 November 1902 – 23 March 1998) was a French pteridologist who worked at the National Museum of Natural History (France) and is noted for describing over 400 species. The genus of ferns Blotiella was named in her honor.  She was married to the author Jean Tardieu.

References 

1902 births
1998 deaths
20th-century French botanists
Pteridologists
20th-century French women scientists